Arvagh, or Arva, is a village in County Cavan, Ireland, on the shores of Garty Lough and overlooked by Bruse Mountain. It is located on the junction of the R198 and R203 regional roads.

It is situated in the centre of the drumlin belt on the border of Counties Longford and Leitrim. Its location is about 3 km southeast of the tripoint where the three provinces of Ulster, Leinster and Connacht meet.

As of 2016, the village had a population of 411.

History
In 1841, at which time the 1841 Census recorded a population of 69, there were four pubs in the village and the monthly fairs were of considerable local trade importance.

Árṁaċ, or Ármhach (meaning "Battlefield" or "Place of Slaughter"), was brought about because Arvagh is on the borders of 3 counties and provinces, Leitrim, Longford and Cavan (Connaght, Leinster and Ulster). The royal families of these counties would battle in Arvagh and as a result many died, Hence "Place of Slaughter".
In 1836, Arvagh was recorded by John O'Donovan as Airbheach, 'a division'. Under descriptive marks it was recorded that "The town of Arvagh is small...The word Arvagh is derived from a rocky spot in the adjoining townland and on which the despensary is built, which signifies the place of blood or slaughter"

Events
Each year the Arvagh Agricultural Show takes place in the village. The "3 Province Festival" also takes place here over 10 days from the last weekend in July until the first weekend in August. The festival includes music, theatre, comedy, art, competitions and other events.

Demographics
Area in Statute  Acres is 17,074
In 1861 Arvagh had a population of 6,294.
In 1871 Arvagh had a population of 5,777.
In 1881 this had fallen to 5,606
In 1891 the population was 4,912
In 1901 the population was 4,381
In 1911 the population was 3,994

Transport

Bus
Whartons Travel operate bus route 975 on behalf of the National Transport Authority. It serves the village six times a day (not Sundays) providing services to Longford via Drumlish and Cavan. Bus Éireann route 465, (Carrigallen-Killashandra-Cavan) serves the village on Tuesday.

Rail
Arva Road railway station on the erstwhile Killashandra branch was the nearest station to Arvagh. Nowadays bus route 975 provides a link to Longford railway station.

Angling
The Arvagh area has numerous angling sites such as Garty Lough, Hollybank Lake, Gulladoo Lake, Guiniken Lake and Rockfield Lake. The Arvagh International Fishing Festival takes place in Arvagh every September.

See also
 List of towns and villages in Ireland
 Market Houses in Ireland

References

Towns and villages in County Cavan